Kenneth Whitehead (born 11 April 1955) is a Canadian former soccer player who competed at the 1976 Summer Olympics.

He played for Simon Fraser University in 1975 and 1976 and still holds the SFU single season record for most points in a season (61) and most goals in a season (28) in 1976. Despite playing only 37 games, he sits 7th in all-time scoring.  SFU won the NAIA championship in Ken's final year.   

He played professional soccer with the Los Angeles Aztecs in 1977.

References

External links
 
 

1955 births
Living people
Canadian soccer players
Olympic soccer players of Canada
Footballers at the 1976 Summer Olympics
Soccer players from Vancouver
UBC Thunderbirds soccer players
University of British Columbia alumni
Simon Fraser Clan men's soccer players
Simon Fraser University alumni
Association football forwards